Blato na Cetini is a village in Split-Dalmatia County, Croatia.

Populated places in Split-Dalmatia County